is a Japanese fencer. He competed in the individual sabre events at the 2000 and 2004 Summer Olympics.

References

External links
 

1977 births
Living people
Japanese male sabre fencers
Olympic fencers of Japan
Fencers at the 2000 Summer Olympics
Fencers at the 2004 Summer Olympics
People from Gifu
Fencers at the 2002 Asian Games
Fencers at the 2006 Asian Games
Asian Games bronze medalists for Japan
Medalists at the 2006 Asian Games
Asian Games medalists in fencing
20th-century Japanese people
21st-century Japanese people